Xinwan Town is an urban town in Yuanjiang, Yiyang, Hunan Province, People's Republic of China.

Administrative division
The town is divided into eight villages and one community, the following areas: Zhenxing Community, Mingyue Village, Banshanzhou Village, Xinwan Village, Lianhua Village, Laowuchong Village, Qiaobei Village, Yanggelao Village, and Zhougonghu Village (振兴社区、明月村、畔山洲村、新湾村、莲花村、老屋冲村、桥北村、杨阁老村、周公湖村).

References

Divisions of Yuanjiang